Javiera Cereceda Orrego (born 19 May 1968), better known as Javiera Parra, is a Chilean musician and singer born in Santiago. She is the lead singer of rock band Javiera y Los Imposibles. A third generation member of Chile's Parra family, known for its many musicians, she is the granddaughter of famous Chilean folklorist Violeta Parra. Her father Ángel Parra is a member of rock group Los Tres.

See also
 Music of Chile
 List of Chileans

References

1968 births
20th-century Chilean women singers
Chilean guitarists
Chilean singer-songwriters
Women guitarists
Living people
People from Santiago
Javiera
21st-century Chilean women singers